Yew Chung International School of Beijing (YCIS Beijing) is an K2-Year 13 co-educational international school in Chaoyang District, Beijing.

Origins and history
The Yew Chung International School of Beijing is an accredited International School located in downtown Beijing adjacent the Honglingjin Park. It offers education to expatriate children aged 2 to 18 years old (K2 to Year 13, offering early childhood education or kindergarten, primary school education, and secondary school education (IGCSE and IBDP). The school works 是 on the Co-Teaching Model. The international school is part of a network of schools under the Yew Chung Education Foundation which includes campuses in Shanghai, Qingdao, Chongqing, Hong Kong, and Silicon Valley, United States.

Timeline 
 1995 – YCIS Beijing is founded.
1997 – YCIS Beijing adopts its Co-Teaching Model.
2001 – The In-School Individual Instrumental Programme (IIIP) is introduced and YCIS Beijing becomes an exam centre for the Associated Board of the Royal Schools of Music.
2003 – YCIS Beijing celebrates its first International Day and the new Secondary School library and computer labs are opened.
2006 – The school begins offering University Guidance and Student Counselling services and employs a Primary Curriculum Co-ordinator. Both the IBDP and IGCSE programmes are formally implemented.
2008 – YCIS Beijing raises relief donations for victims of the Sichuan earthquake, sparking the beginnings of the Seeds of Hope project.
2009 – YCIS Beijing is formally accredited by three separate academic accreditation organizations.
2015 – YCIS Beijing celebrates its 20th anniversary.
2019 – YCIS Beijing celebrates the 87th anniversary of the founding of the Yew Chung Education Foundation.
2020 – YCIS Beijing Celebrates its 25th anniversary.

Accreditation 
 Council of International Schools (CIS)
Cambridge International Certificate of Secondary Education (IGCSE)
International Baccalaureate Diploma Programme (IBDP)
The East Asia Regional Council of Schools (EARCOS)
Cambridge Assessment International Education
Association of China and Mongolia International Schools (ACAMIS)

Awards
In June 2012 Yew Chung International Schools received the “Cambridge Award for Excellence in Education”, the only international school in China to receive this award.

Further reading
"Bringing the world into the classroom." China Daily Education. April 16, 2013.

References

 Beijing Kids School Directory http://www.beijing-kids.com/directory/Yew-Chung-International-School-of-Beijing 
 Austcham Directory http://www.austcham.org/members/Yew%20Chung%20International%20School%20of%20Beijing

Network of schools
 Yew Chung International School of Hong Kong
 Yew Chung International School of Shanghai
 Yew Chung International School of Beijing
 Yew Chung International School of Chongqing
 Yew Chung International School of Qingdao
 Yew Chung International School of Silicon Valley

Famous Student
Carlton Leung, wrote a song "Night Sky"
Jaydon Chieng, math expert
Kevin, Giao/oogway
Hayul, tall boy
 David, pro 24 hour gamer

External links 
 Yew Chung International School of Beijing

Schools in Chaoyang District, Beijing
International schools in Beijing
Cambridge schools in China
International Baccalaureate schools in China
Association of China and Mongolia International Schools